The 2nd constituency of Moselle is a French legislative constituency in the Moselle département.

Description

Moselle's 2nd constituency includes the eastern edge of the city of Metz as well as rural areas to the south and south-west as well as most of the large suburb of Montigny-lès-Metz. The seat borders Meurthe-et-Moselle to the west and includes territory on both sides of the river Moselle.

From 1988 until 2017 the seat was held by one man, Denis Jacquat, who in 2002 switched from the UDF to the newly formed UMP of Nicolas Sarkozy. At the 2012 election the Socialists came within less than 700 votes of taking the seat.

Historic Representation

Election results

2022 

 
 
|-
| colspan="8" bgcolor="#E9E9E9"|
|-
 

 
 
 
 
 

* Dissident PS member, not supported by the party or the NUPES alliance.

2017

2012

 
 
 
 
 
 
|-
| colspan="8" bgcolor="#E9E9E9"|
|-

Sources
Official results of French elections from 2002: "Résultats électoraux officiels en France" (in French).

2